Pierre-Hugues Herbert and Albano Olivetti were the defending champions but only Olivetti chose to defend his title, partnering Kevin Krawietz. Olivetti lost in the first round to Roman Jebavý and Igor Zelenay.

Adil Shamasdin and Andrei Vasilevski won the title after defeating Mikhail Elgin and Denys Molchanov 6–3, 3–6, [21–19] in the final.

Seeds

Draw

References

External links
 Main draw

Wrocław Open - Doubles
Wrocław Open